The northern goshawk (Accipiter gentilis) is a species of medium-large bird of prey in the family Accipitridae, a family which also includes other extant diurnal raptors, such as eagles, buzzards and harriers. As a species in the genus Accipiter, the goshawk is often considered a "true hawk". The scientific name is Latin; Accipiter is "hawk", from accipere, "to grasp", and gentilis is "noble" or "gentle" because in the Middle Ages only the nobility were permitted to fly goshawks for falconry.

This species was first described by Linnaeus in his Systema naturae in 1758 as Falco gentilis.

It is a widespread species that inhabits many of the temperate parts of the Northern Hemisphere. The northern goshawk is the only species in the genus Accipiter found in both Eurasia and North America. It may have the second widest distribution of any true member of the family Accipitridae, behind arguably only the golden eagle (Aquila chrysaetos), which has a broader range to the south of Asia than the goshawk. The only other acciptrid species to also range in both North America and Eurasia, according to  current opinion, is the more Arctic-restricted rough-legged buzzard (Buteo lagopus). Except in a small portion of southern Asia, it is the only species of "goshawk" in its range and it is thus often referred to, both officially and unofficially, as simply the "goshawk". It is mainly resident, but birds from colder regions migrate south for the winter. In North America, migratory goshawks are often seen migrating south along mountain ridge tops at nearly any time of the fall depending on latitude.

Distribution
The northern goshawk has a large circumpolar distribution. In Eurasia, it is found in most areas of Europe excluding Ireland and Iceland. It has a fairly spotty distribution in western Europe (e.g. Great Britain, Spain, France) but is more or less found continuously through the rest of the continent. Their Eurasian distribution sweeps continuously across most of Russia, excluding the fully treeless tundra in the northern stretches, to the western limits of Siberia as far as Anadyr and Kamchatka. In the Eastern Hemisphere, they are found in their southern limits in extreme northwestern Morocco, Corsica and Sardinia, the "toe" of Italy, southern Greece, Turkey, the Caucasus, Sinkiang's Tien Shan, in some parts of Tibet and the Himalayas (India and Nepal), western China and Japan. In winter, northern goshawks may be found rarely as far south as Taif in Saudi Arabia and perhaps Tonkin, Vietnam.

In North America, they are most broadly found in the western United States, including Alaska, and western Canada. Their breeding range in the western contiguous United States largely consists of the wooded foothills of the Rocky Mountains and many other large mountain ranges from Washington to southern California extending east to central Colorado and westernmost Texas. Somewhat discontinuous breeding populations are found in southeastern Arizona and southwestern New Mexico, thence also somewhat spottily into western Mexico down through Sonora and Chihuahua along the Sierra Madre Occidental as far as Jalisco and Guerrero, their worldwide southern limit as a breeding species.

The goshawk continues east through much of Canada as a native species, but is rarer in most of the eastern United States, especially the Midwest where they are not typically found outside the Great Lakes region, where a good-sized breeding population occurs in the northern parts of Minnesota, Illinois, Michigan and somewhat into Ohio; a very small population persists in the extreme northeast corner of North Dakota. They breed also in mountainous areas of New England, New York, central Pennsylvania and northwestern New Jersey, sporadically down to extreme northwestern Maryland and northeastern West Virginia. Vagrants have been reported in Ireland, North Africa (central Morocco, northern Algeria, Tunisia, Libya, Egypt); the Arabian Peninsula (Israel, Jordan, Saudi Arabia), southwest Asia (southern Iran, Pakistan), western India (Gujarat) and on Izu-shoto (south of Japan) and the Commander Islands, and in most of the parts of the United States where they do not breed.

Habitat

Northern goshawks can be found in both deciduous and coniferous forests. While the species might show strong regional preferences for certain trees, they seem to have no strong overall preferences nor even a preference between deciduous or coniferous trees despite claims to the contrary. More important than the type of trees are the composition of a given tree stand, which should be tall, old-growth with intermediate to heavy canopy coverage (often more than 40%) and minimal density undergrowth, both of which are favorable for hunting conditions. Also, goshawks typically require proximity to openings in which to execute additional hunting. More so than in North America, the goshawks of Eurasia, especially central Europe, may live in fairly urbanized patchworks of small woods, shelter-belts and copses and even use largely isolated trees in central parts of Eurasian cities. Even if they are far more wary of human presence than the Eurasian sparrowhawk, northern goshhawks are known to live in some relatively densely wooded areas of large cities of Central Europe, such as Berlin and Hamburg; it is a relatively new phenomenon that started in the 20th century. Access to waterways and riparian zones of any kind is not uncommon in goshawk home ranges but seems to not be a requirement. Narrow tree-lined riparian zones in otherwise relatively open habitats can provide suitable wintering habitat in the absence of more extensive woodlands. The northern goshawk can be found at almost any altitude, but recently is typically found at high elevations due to a paucity of extensive forests remaining in lowlands across much of its range. Altitudinally, goshawks may live anywhere up to a given mountain range's tree line, which is usually  in elevation or less. The northern limit of their distribution also coincides with the tree line and here may adapt to dwarf tree communities, often along drainages of the lower tundra. In winter months, the northernmost or high mountain populations move down to warmer forests with lower elevations, often continuing to avoid detection except while migrating. A majority of goshawks around the world remain sedentary throughout the year.

Description

The northern goshawk has relatively short, broad wings and a long tail, typical for Accipiter species and common to raptors that require maneuverability within forest habitats. For an Accipiter, it has a relatively sizeable bill, relatively long wings, a relatively short tail, robust and fairly short legs and particularly thick toes. Across most of the species' range, it is blue-grey above or brownish-grey with dark barring or streaking over a grey or white base color below, but Asian subspecies in particular range from nearly white overall to nearly black above. Goshawks tend to show clinal variation in color, with most goshawks further north being paler and those in warmer areas being darker but individuals can be either dark in the north or pale in the south. Individuals that live a long life may gradually become paler as they age, manifesting in mottling and a lightening of the back from a darker shade to a bluer pale color. Its plumage is more variable than that of the Eurasian sparrowhawk (Accipiter nisus), which is probably due to higher genetic variability in the larger goshawk. The juvenile northern goshawk is usually a solid to mildly streaky brown above, with many variations in underside color from nearly pure white to almost entirely overlaid with broad dark cinnamon-brown striping. Both juveniles and adults have a barred tail, with 3 to 5 dark brown or black bars. Adults always have a white eye stripe or supercilia, which tends to be broader in northern Eurasian and North American birds. In North America, juveniles have pale-yellow eyes, and adults develop dark red eyes usually after their second year, although nutrition and genetics may affect eye color as well. In Europe and Asia, juveniles also have pale-yellow eyes while adults typically develop orange-colored eyes, though some may have only brighter yellow or occasionally ochre or brownish eye color. Moulting starts between late March and late May, the male tends to moult later and faster than the female. Moulting results in the female being especially likely to have a gap in its wing feathers while incubating and this may cause some risk, especially if the male is lost, as it inhibits her hunting abilities and may hamper her defensive capabilities, putting both herself and the nestlings in potential danger of predation. The moult takes a total of 4–6 months, with tail feathers following the wings then lastly the contour and body feathers, which may not be completely moulted even as late as October.

Although existing wing size and body mass measurements indicate that the Henst's goshawk (Accipiter henstii) and Meyer's goshawk (Accipiter meyerianus) broadly overlap in size with this species, the northern goshawk is on average the largest member of the genus Accipiter, especially outsizing its tropic cousins in the larger Eurasian races. The northern goshawk, like all Accipiters, exhibits sexual dimorphism, where females are significantly larger than males, with the dimorphism notably greater in most parts of Eurasia. Linearly, males average about 8% smaller in North America and 13% smaller than females in Eurasia, but in the latter landmass can range up to a very noticeable 28% difference in extreme cases. In a study of North American goshawks (A. g. atricapillus), males were found to average  in total length, against females which averaged .

Voice

Northern goshawks normally only vocalize during courtship or the nesting season. Adult goshawks may chatter a repeated note, varying in speed and volume based on the context. When calling from a perch, birds often turn their heads slowly from side to side, producing a ventriloquial effect. The male calls a fast, high-pitched kew-kew-kew when delivering food or else a very different croaking guck or chup. The latter sound has been considered by some authors similar to that of a person snapping the tongue away from the roof the mouth; the males produce it by holding the beak wide open, thrusting the head up and forward, then bringing it down as the sound is emitted, repeated at intervals of five seconds. This call is uttered when the male encounters a female. Two calls have been recorded mainly from brooding females in the race A. g. atricapillus: a recognition scream of short, intense notes (whee-o or hee-ya) which ends in harsh, falsetto tone; then a dismissal call given when the male lingers after delivering food, consisting of a choked, cut-off scream. Meanwhile, the adult female's rapid strident kek-kek-kek expresses alarm or intent to mob towards threatening intruders. This is often done when mobbing a predator such as a great horned owl (Bubo virginianus) and as it progresses the female's voice may lower slightly in pitch and becomes harsh and rasping. As the intensity of her attacks increases, her kakking becomes more rapid and can attain a constant screaming quality. Females often withdraw into the treetops when fatigued, and their calls are then spaced at longer intervals. Males respond to interlopers or predators with a quieter, slower gek gek gek or ep ep ep. A call consisting of kek…kek.kekk kek kek-kek-kek is used mainly by females in advertisement and during pre-laying mutual calling. Both sexes also may engage in kakking during copulation. Vocalizations mainly peak in late courtship/early nesting around late March to April, can begin up to 45 minutes before sunrise, and are more than twice in as frequent in the first three hours of daylight as in the rest of the day. Occasionally hunting northern goshawks may make shrill screams when pursuing prey, especially if a lengthy chase is undertaken and the prey is already aware of its intended predator.

Similar species

The juvenile plumage of the species may cause some confusion, especially with other Accipiter juveniles. Unlike other northern Accipiters, the adult northern goshawk never has a rusty color to its underside barring.  In Eurasia, the smaller male goshawk is sometimes confused with a female sparrowhawk, but is still notably larger, much bulkier and has relatively longer wings, which are more pointed and less boxy. Sparrowhawks tend to fly in a frequently flapping, fluttering type flight. Wing beats of northern goshawks are deeper, more deliberate, and on average slower than those of the Eurasian sparrowhawk or the two other North American Accipiters. The classic Accipiter flight is a characteristic "flap flap, glide", but the goshawk, with its greater wing area, can sometimes be seen steadily soaring in migration (smaller Accipiters almost always need to flap to stay aloft). In North America juveniles are sometimes confused with the smaller Cooper's hawk (Accipiter cooperii), especially between small male goshawks and large female Cooper's hawks. Unlike in Europe with sparrowhawks, Cooper's hawks can have a largish appearance and juveniles may be regularly mistaken for the usually less locally numerous goshawk. However, the juvenile goshawk displays a heavier, vertical streaking pattern on chest and abdomen, with the juvenile Cooper's hawk streaking frequently (but not always) in a “teardrop” pattern wherein the streaking appears to taper at the top, as opposed to the more even streaking of the goshawk. The goshawk sometimes seems to have a shorter tail relative to its much broader body. Although there appears to be a size overlap between small male goshawks and large female Cooper's hawks, morphometric measurements (wing and tail length) of both species demonstrate no such overlap, although weight overlap can rarely occur due to variation in seasonal condition and food intake at time of weighing. Rarely, in the southern stretches of its Asian wintering range, the northern goshawk may live alongside the crested goshawk (Accipiter trivirgatus) which is smaller (roughly Cooper's hawk-sized) and has a slight crest as well as a distinct mixture of denser streaks and bars below and no supercilia.

Northern goshawks are sometimes mistaken for species even outside of the genus Accipiter especially as juveniles of each respective species. In North America, four species of buteonine hawk (all four of which are smaller than goshawks to a certain degree) may be confused with them on occasion despite the differing proportions of these hawks, which all have longer wings and shorter tails relative to their size. A species so similar it is sometimes nicknamed the "Mexican goshawk", gray hawk (Buteo plagiatus) juveniles (overlapping with true goshawks in the southwest United States into Mexico) have contrasting face pattern with bold dusky eye-stripes, dark eyes, barred thighs and a bold white "U" on the uppertail coverts. The roadside hawk (Rupornis magnirostris) (rarely in same range in Mexico) is noticeably smaller with paddle-shaped wings, barred lower breast and a buff “U” on undertail coverts in young birds. Somewhat less likely to confuse despite their broader extent of overlap are the red-shouldered hawk (Buteo lineatus) which have a narrow white-barred, dark-looking tail, bold white crescents on their primaries and dark wing edges and the broad-winged hawk (Buteo playpterus) which also has dark wing edges and a differing tapered wing shape. Even wintering gyrfalcon (Falco rusticolus) juveniles have been mistaken for goshawks and vice versa on occasion, especially when observed distantly perched. However, the bulkier, broader headed yet relatively shorter tailed falcon still has many tell-tale falcon characteristics like pointed, longer wings, a brown malar stripe as well as its more extensive barring both above and below.

Taxonomy
The genus Accipiter contains nearly 50 known living species and is the most diverse genus of diurnal raptors in the world. This group of agile, smallish, forest-dwelling hawks has been in existence for possibly tens of millions of years, probably as an adaptation to the explosive numbers of small birds that began to occupy the world's forest in the last few eras. The harriers are the only group of extant diurnal raptors that seem to bear remotely close relation to this genus, whereas buteonines, Old World kites, sea eagles and chanting-goshawks are much more distantly related and all other modern accipitrids are not directly related.

Within the genus Accipiter, the northern goshawk seems to belong to a superspecies with other larger goshawks from different portions of the world. Meyer's goshawk, found in the South Pacific, has been posited as the most likely to be most close related living cousin to the northern goshawk, the somewhat puzzling gap in their respective ranges explained by other Palearctic raptors such as Bonelli's eagles (Aquila fasciata) and short-toed eagles (Circaetus gallicus) that have extant isolated tropical island populations and were probably part of the same southwest Pacific radiation that led to the Meyer's goshawk. A presumably older radiation of this group occurred in Africa, where it led to both the Henst's goshawk of Madagascar and the black sparrowhawk (Accipiter melanoleucus) of the mainland. While the Henst's goshawk quite resembles the northern goshawks, the black sparrowhawk is superficially described as a “sparrowhawk” due to its relatively much longer and finer legs than those of typical goshawks but overall its size and plumage (especially that of juveniles) is much more goshawk than sparrowhawk-like.

Outside of the presumed superspecies, the genus Erythrotriorchis may be part of an Australasian radiation of basal goshawks based largely on their similar morphology to northern goshawks. Genetic studies have indicated that the Cooper's hawk of North America is also fairly closely related to the northern goshawk, having been present in North America before either of the other two North American Accipiters. However, the much smaller sharp-shinned hawk, which has similar plumage to the Cooper's hawk and seems to be most closely related to the Eurasian sparrowhawk, appears to have occupied North America the latest of the three North American species, despite having the broadest current distribution of any Accipiter in the Americas (extending down through much of South America).

The term goshawk comes from the Old English gōsheafoc, "goose-hawk".

Subspecies

The northern goshawk appears to have diversified in northern, central Eurasia and spread both westwards to occupy Europe and, later on, eastwards to spread into North America across the Bering Land Bridge. Fossil remains show that goshawks were present in California by the Pleistocene era. Two non-exclusive processes could have occurred to cause the notably color and size variation of northern goshawks throughout its range: isolation in the past enabled gene combinations to assort as distinct morphs that suited conditions in different geographical areas, followed by a remixing of these genotypes to result in clines, or subtle variation in modern selection pressures led to a diversity of hues and patterns. As a result of the high variation of individual goshawks in plumage characteristics and typical trends in clinal variation and size variations that largely follow Bergmann's rule and Gloger's rule, an excessive number of subspecies have been described for the northern goshawk in the past. In Europe (including European Russia) alone, 12 subspecies were described between 1758 and 1990. Most modern authorities agree on listing nine to ten subspecies of northern goshawks from throughout its range.

 A. g. gentilis (Linnaeus, 1758) – The nominate race is distributed through most of the species current European range, excluding northern Fennoscandia, northwestern Russia and possibly some of the Mediterranean islands they inhabit. Outside of Europe, this subspecies' range extends south to northwestern Africa (almost entirely Morocco) and east in Eurasia to Urals, the Caucasus and Asia Minor. It is a typically large subspecies, with high levels of sexual dimorphism. In some cases, the largest adult females (including some exceptionally big females which are the heaviest goshawks known from anywhere) from within a population are up to four times heavier than the smallest adult males, although this is exceptional. The nominate race is generally a dark slaty-brown color on its back and wing coverts with a blackish-brown head. The supercilium is thin and the underside is generally creamy with heavy dark barring. On average, in addition to their smaller size, nominate goshawks to the south of the race's distribution have thinner supericilia and broader and denser barring on the underside. An aberrant “isabelline” morph is known mainly from central and eastern Europe, where the goshawk may be a general beige color (somewhat similar to the pale birds from the races albidus and buteoides), but such birds appear to be very rare.
A. g. arrigonii (Kleinschmidt, 1903) – This is an island race found on the Mediterranean isles of Sardinia and Corsica. It averages smaller and weaker-footed than goshawks from the nominate race. This race is typically a more blackish brown above with almost fully black head, while the underside is almost pure white and more heavily overlaid with black barring and conspicuous black shaft-streaks. This subspecies is not listed by all authorities but is often considered valid.
A. g. buteoides (Menzbier, 1882) – This race is characteristic of the northern stretches of the western Eurasian range of goshawks, being found as a breeding species from northern Fennoscandia to western Siberia, ranging as far as the Lena River. In the eastern portion of its distribution, many birds may travel south to central Asia to winter. This is a large race, averaging larger than most populations of the nominate race but being about the same size as the big nominate goshawks with which they may overlap and interbreed with in Fennoscandia. Usually, this race is an altogether paler colour than the nominate, being blue-grey above with a dusky-grey crown and a broad supercilium. The underside is white with rather fine blackish-brown barring. Pale flecking on the feather shafts sometimes result in barred appearance on the contour feathers of the nape, back and upper wing. Many birds from this subspecies also have a tan to pale brown eye color. These two characteristics are sometimes considered typical of this race, but individuals are rather variable. In western Siberia, about 10% of birds of this race are nearly pure white (similar to albidus) with varied indications of darker streaking.
A. g. albidus (Menzbier, 1882) – This race of goshawk is found in northeastern Siberia and Kamchatka. Many birds of this race travel south for the winter to Transbaikalia, northern Mongolia and Ussuriland. This race continues the trend for goshawks to grow mildly larger eastbound in Eurasia and may be the largest known race based on the midpoint of known measurements of this race, although limited sample sizes of measured goshawks shows they broadly overlap in size with A. g. buteoides and large-bodied populations of A. g. gentilis. This is easily the palest race of northern goshawk. Many birds are pale grey above with much white about the head and very sparse barring below. However, about half of the goshawks of this race are more or less pure white, with at most only a few remnants of pale caramel flecking about the back or faint brownish markings elsewhere.
A. g. schvedowi (Menzbier, 1882) – This race ranges from the Urals east to the Amurland, Ussuriland, Manchuria, west-central China and sporadically as a breeder into Sakhalin and the Kuril islands. A. g. schvedowi averages smaller than the other races on the mainland of Eurasia, with seemingly the highest sexual dimorphism of any goshawk race, possibly as an adaptation to prey partitioning in the exceptionally sparse wooded fringes of the desert-like steppe habitat that characterizes this race's range. Beyond its smaller size, its wings are reportedly relatively shorter and feet relatively smaller and weaker than other Eurasian races. In color, this race is typically a slate-grey above with a blackish head and is densely marked below with thin brown barring.
A. g. fujiyamae (Swann & Hartert, 1923) – Found through the species' range in Japan, from the islands of Hokkaido south to the large island of Honshu, in the latter down to as far south as forests a bit north of Hiroshima. A fairly small subspecies, it may average slightly smaller than A. g. schvedowi linearly, but it is less sexually dimorphic in size and weighs slightly more on average. The coloration of this race is not dissimilar from A. g. schvedowi, but is still darker slate above and they tend to have heavier barring below, probably being the darkest race on average, rivaled only by the similar insular race from the opposite side of the Pacific, A. g. laingi.
A. g. atricapillus (Wilson, 1812) – Sometimes simply referred to as the American goshawk. This subspecies occupies a majority of the species' range in North America, excluding some islands of the Pacific Northwest and the southern part of the American Southwest. American goshawks are generally slightly smaller on average than most Eurasian ones, although there are regional differences in size that confirm mildly to Bergmann's rule within this race. Furthermore, sexual dimorphism in size is notably less pronounced in American goshawks than in most Eurasian races. Size within atricapillus based on body mass seems to be highest in interior Alaska, followed by the Great Lakes, is intermediate in the northwest United States from eastern Washington to the Dakotas as well as in southeast Alaska thence decreasing mildly along the Pacific in Oregon and California and smallest of all within the race in the Great Basin and Colorado Plateau states (i.e. Nevada, Utah and northern and central Arizona). Conspicuously, wing size did not correspond to variations in body mass and more southerly goshawks were frequently longer winged than the more massive northerly ones. Almost identical mean weights for goshawks as in Alaska were recorded for goshawks from Alberta as well. This race is typically a blue-gray color above with a boldly contrasting black head and broad white supercilia. American goshawks are often grayish below with fine gray waving barring and, compared to most Eurasian goshawks, rather apparent black shaft streaks which in combination create a vermiculated effect that is all-together messier looking than in most Eurasian birds. From a distance, atricapillus can easily appear solidly all-gray from the front. Due to this, the adult goshawk in America is sometimes called the “gray ghost”, a name also somewhat more commonly used for adult male hen harriers. Birds from mainland Alaska tend to be paler overall with more pale flecking than other American goshawks.
A. g. laingi (Tavernier, 1940) – This insular race is found on the Queen Charlotte Islands and Vancouver Island. This subspecies is slightly smaller than the goshawks found on the mainland and is linearly the smallest race on average in North America. These goshawks are characteristically darker than mainland goshawks with the black of the crown extending to the interscapulars. The underside is a sootier gray overall.
A. g. apache (van Rossem, 1938) – The range of this subspecies extends from southern Arizona and New Mexico down throughout the species' range in Mexico. This subspecies has the longest median wing size of any race, running contrary to Bergmann's rule that northern birds should outsize southern ones in widely distributed temperate species. However, in terms of body mass, it is only slightly heavier than the goshawks found discontinuously somewhat to the north in the Great Basin and the Colorado Plateau and lighter than the heaviest known American goshawks from Alaska, Alberta and Wisconsin despite exceeding the goshawks from these areas in wing size. Aside from its overall larger size, apache reportedly averages larger in foot size than most other American goshawks. Birds of this race tend to be darker than other American goshawks aside from the laingi type birds. Due to its shortage of distinct features beyond proportions, this is considered one of the more weakly separated among current separate subspecies, with some authors considering it merely a clinal variation of atricapillus. Even the greater wing size in southern birds follows a trend for the wing chord to increase in size in the south on the contrary to body mass.

Behavior

Territoriality

The northern goshawk is always found solitarily or in pairs. This species is highly territorial, as are most raptorial birds, maintaining regularly spaced home ranges that constitute their territory. Territories are maintained by adults in display flights. During display flight goshawks may engage in single or mutual high-circling. Each sex tends to defend the territory from others of their own sex. Territorial flights may occur throughout most of the year, but peak from January to April. Such flights may include slow-flapping with exaggerated high deep beats interspersed with long glides and undulations. In general, territorial fights are resolved without physical contact, often with one (usually a younger bird seeking a territory) retreating while the other approaches in a harrier-like warning flight, flashing its white underside at the intruder. If the incoming goshawk does not leave the vicinity, the defending goshawk may increase the exaggerated quality of its flight including a mildly undulating wave-formed rowing flight and the rowing flight with its neck held in a heron-like S to elevate the head and maximally expose the pale breast as a territorial threat display. Territorial skirmishes may on occasion escalate to physical fights in which mortalities may occur. In actual fights, goshawks fall grappling to the ground as they attempt to strike each other with talons.

Migration
Although at times considered rather sedentary for a northern raptor species, the northern goshawk is a partial migrant. Migratory movements generally occur between September and November (occasionally extending throughout December) in the fall and February to April in the spring. Spring migration is less extensive and more poorly known than fall migration, but seems to peak late March to early April. Some birds, up to as far north as northern Canada and central Scandinavia, may remain in their territory throughout the winter. In northern Sweden, young generally disperse somewhat south, whereas in south and central Sweden, they are typically distributed to the south (but not usually across the 5-km Kattegat straits). On the other hand, 4.3% of the southern Swedish goshawks actually moved north. Migrating goshawks seem to avoid crossing water, but sparrowhawks seem to do so more regularly. In Eurasia, very small numbers of migratory northern goshawks cross the Strait of Gibraltar and Bosporus in autumn but further east more significant winter range expansions may extend from northern Iran & southern Turkmenia to Aral & Balkhash lakes, from Kashmir to Assam, extreme northwestern Thailand, northern Vietnam, southern China, Taiwan, Ryukyu Islands and South Korea. Migratory goshawks in North America may move down to Baja California, Sinaloa and into most of west Texas, but generally in non-irruptive years, goshawks winter no further south than Nebraska, Iowa, Illinois, Indiana, eastern Tennessee and western North Carolina. Some periodic eruptions to nearly as far as the Gulf of Mexico have been recorded at no fewer than 10 years apart. In one case, a female that was banded in Wisconsin was recovered  in Louisiana, a first ever record of the species in that state.

Prey availability may primarily dictate the proportion of goshawk populations that migrate and the selection of wintering areas, followed by the presence of snow which may aid prey capture in the short-term but in the long-term is likely to cause higher goshawk mortality. Showing the high variability of migratory movements, in one study of winter movements of adult female goshawks that bred in high-elevation forests of Utah, about 36% migrated  to the general south, 22% migrated farther than that distance, 8.3% migrated less far, 2.7% went north instead of south and 31% stayed throughout winter on their breeding territory. Irruptive movements seem to occur for northern populations, i.e. those of the boreal forests in North America, Scandinavia, and possibly Siberia, with more equal sex ratio of movement and a strong southward tendency of movements in years where prey such as hares and grouse crash. Male young goshawks tend to disperse farther than females, which is unusual in birds, including raptors. It has been speculated that larger female juveniles displace male juveniles, forcing them to disperse farther, to the incidental benefit of the species’ genetic diversity. In Cedar Grove, Wisconsin, there were more than twice as many juvenile males than females recorded migrating. At the hawk watch at Cape May Point State Park in New Jersey, few adult males and no adult females have been recorded in fall migration apart from irruptive years, indicating that migration is more important to juveniles.  More juveniles were recorded migrating than adults in several years of study from Sweden. In northern Accipiters including the goshawk, there seems to be multiple peaks in numbers of migrants, an observation that suggests partial segregation by age and sex.

Dietary biology

Hunting behavior

As typical of the genus Accipiter (as well as unrelated forest-dwelling raptors of various lineages), the northern goshawk has relatively short wings and a long tail which make it ideally adapted to engaging in brief but agile and twisting hunting flights through dense vegetation of wooded environments. This species is a powerful hunter, taking birds and mammals in a variety of woodland habitats, often utilizing a combination of speed and obstructing cover to ambush their victims. Goshawks often forage in adjoining habitat types, such as the edge of a forest and meadow. Hunting habitat can be variable, as in a comparison of habitats used in England found that only 8% of landscapes used were woodlands whereas in Sweden 73-76% of the habitat used was woodland, albeit normally within  of an opening. In North America, goshawks are generally rather more likely than those from Eurasia to hunt within the confines of mature forest, excluding areas where prey numbers are larger outside of the forest, such as where scrub-dwelling cottontails are profuse. One study from central Sweden found that locally goshawks typically hunt within the largest patches of mature forests, selecting second growth forest less than half as often as its prevalence in the local environment. The northern goshawk is typically considered a perch-hunter. Hunting efforts are punctuated by a series of quick flights low to the ground, interspersed with brief periods of scanning for unsuspecting prey from elevated perches (short duration sit-and-wait predatory movements). These flights are meant to be inconspicuous, averaging about 83 seconds in males and 94 seconds in females, and prey pursuits may be abandoned if the victims become aware of the goshawk too quickly. More sporadically, northern goshawks may watch from prey from a high soar or gliding flight above the canopy. One study in Germany found an exceptional 80% of hunting efforts to be done from a high soar but the author admitted that he was probably biased by the conspicuousness of this method. In comparison, a study from Great Britain found that 95% of hunting efforts were from perches. A strong bias for pigeons as prey and a largely urbanized environment in Germany explains the local prevalence of hunting from a soaring flight, as the urban environment provides ample thermals and obstructing tall buildings which are ideal for hunting pigeons on the wing.

Northern goshawks rarely vary from their perch-hunting style that typifies the initial part of their hunt but seems to be able to show nearly endless variation to the concluding pursuit. Hunting goshawks seem to not only utilize thick vegetation to block them from view for their prey (as typical of Accipiters) but, while hunting flying birds, they seem to be able to adjust their flight level so the prey is unable to see its hunter past their own tails. Once a prey item is selected, a short tail-chase may occur. The northern goshawk is capable of considerable, sustained, horizontal speed in pursuit of prey with speeds of  reported. While pursuing prey, northern goshawks has been described both “reckless” and “fearless", able to pursue their prey through nearly any conditions. There are various times goshawks have been observed going on foot to pursue prey, at times running without hesitation (in a crow-like, but more hurried gait) into dense thickets and brambles (especially in pursuit of galliforms trying to escape), as well as into water (i.e. usually waterfowl). Anecdotal cases have been reported when goshawks have pursue domestic prey into barns and even houses. Prey pursuits may become rather prolonged depending upon the goshawk's determination and hunger, ranging up to 15 minutes while harrying a terrified, agile squirrel or hare, and occasional pair hunting may benefit goshawks going after agile prey. As is recorded in many accipitrids, hunting in pairs (or “tandem hunting”) normally consist of a breeding pair, with one bird flying conspicuously to distract the prey, while the other swoops in from behind to ambush the victim. When gliding down from a perch to capture prey, a goshawk may not even beat its wings, rendering its flight nearly silent. Prey is killed by driving the talons into the quarry and squeezing while the head is held back to avoid flailing limbs, frequently followed by a kneading action until the prey stops struggling. Kills are normally consumed on the ground by juvenile or non-breeding goshawks (more rarely an elevated perch or old nest) or taken to a low perch by breeding goshawks. Habitual perches are used for dismantling prey especially in the breeding season, often called “plucking perches", which may be fallen logs, bent-over trees, stumps or rocks and can see years of usage. Northern goshawks often leave larger portions of their prey uneaten than other raptors, with limbs, many feathers and fur and other body parts strewn near kill sites and plucking perches, and are helpful to distinguish their kills from other raptors such as large owls, who usually eat everything. Northern goshawks sometimes cache prey on tree branches or wedged in a crotch between branches for up to 32 hours. This is done primarily during the nestling stage. Hunting success rates have been very roughly estimated at 15–30%, within average range for a bird of prey, but may be reported as higher elsewhere. One study claimed hunting success rates for pursuing rabbits was 60% and corvids was 63.8%.

Prey spectrum

Northern goshawks are usually opportunistic predators, as are most birds of prey. The most important prey species are small to medium-sized mammals and medium to large-sized birds found in forest, edge and scrub habitats. Primary prey selection varies considerably not just at the regional but also the individual level as the primary food species can be dramatically different in nests just a few kilometers apart. As is typical in various birds of prey, small prey tends to be underrepresented in prey remains below habitual perches and nests (as only present in skeletal remains within pellets) whereas pellets underrepresent large prey (which is usually dismantled away from the nest) and so a combined study of both remains and pellets is recommended to get a full picture of goshawks' diets. Prey selection also varies by season and a majority of dietary studies are conducted within the breeding season, leaving a possibility of bias for male-selected prey, whereas recent advanced in radio-tagging have allowed a broader picture of goshawks' fairly different winter diet (without needing to kill goshawks to examine their stomach contents).  Northern goshawks have a varied diet that has reportedly included over 500 species from across its range, and at times their prey spectrum can extend to nearly any available kind of bird or mammal except the particularly large varieties as well as atypical prey including reptiles and amphibians, fish and insects. However, a few prey families dominate the diet in most parts of the range, namely corvids, pigeons, grouse, pheasants, thrushes and woodpeckers (in roughly descending order of importance) among birds and squirrels (mainly tree squirrels but also ground squirrels especially in North America) and rabbits and hares among mammals.

Birds are usually the primary prey in Europe, constituting 76.5% of the diet in 17 studies. In North America, by comparison, they constitute 47.8% in 33 studies and mammals account for a nearly equal portion of the diet and in some areas rather dominate the food spectrum. Studies have shown that from several parts of the Eurasian continent from Spain to the Ural mountains mammals contributed only about 9% of the breeding season diet. However, mammals may be slightly underrepresented in Eurasian data because of the little-studied presence of mammals as a food source in winter, particularly in the western and southern portions of Europe where the lack of snowfall can allow large numbers of rabbits. There is some difference in size and type between the prey caught by males and larger females. Prey selection between sexes is more disparate in the more highly dimorphic races from Eurasia than those from North America. In the Netherlands, male prey averaged  whereas female prey averaged , thus a rough 45% difference . Northern goshawks often select young prey during spring and summer, attacking both nestling and fledgling birds and infant and yearling mammals, as such prey is often easiest to catch and convenient to bring to the nest. In general, goshawks in Fennoscandia, shift their prey selection to when the birds produce their young: first waterfowl, then quickly to corvids and thrushes and then lastly to grouse, even though adults are also freely caught opportunistically for all these prey types. This is fairly different from Vendsyssel, Denmark, where mostly adult birds were caught except for thrushes and corvids, as in these two groups, the goshawks caught mostly fledglings.

Corvids
Overall, one prey family that is known to be taken in nearly every part of the goshawk's range is the corvids, although they do not necessarily dominate the diet in all areas. Some 24 species have been reported in the diet. The second most commonly reported prey species in breeding season dietary studies from both Europe and North America are both large jays, the  Eurasian jay (Garrulus glandarius) and the  Steller's jay (Cyanocitta stelleri). These species were recorded in studies from northeastern Poland and the Apennines of Italy (where the Eurasian jays made up a quarter of the food by number) and in northwestern Oregon and the Kaibab Plateau of Arizona (where the Steller's made up 37% by number) as the main prey species by number. The conspicuously loud vocalizations, somewhat sluggish flight (when hunting adult or post-fledging individuals) and moderate size of these jays make them ideal for prey-gathering male goshawks. Another medium-sized corvid, the  Eurasian magpie (Pica pica) is also amongst the most widely reported secondary prey species for goshawks there. Magpies, like large jays, are rather slow fliers and can be handily outpaced by a pursuing goshawk. Some authors claim that taking of large corvids is a rare behavior, due of their intelligence and complex sociality which in turn impart formidable group defenses and mobbing capabilities. One estimation claimed this to be done by about 1–2% of adult goshawks during the breeding season (based largely on studies from Sweden and England), however, on the contrary many goshawks do routinely hunt crows and similar species. In fact, there are some recorded cases where goshawks were able to exploit such mobbing behavior in order to trick crows into close range, where the mob victim suddenly turned to grab one predaceously. In the following areas Corvus species were the leading prey by number: the  hooded crow (Corvus cornix) in the Ural mountains (9% by number), the  western jackdaw (Coloeus monedula) in Sierra de Guadarrama, Spain (36.4% by number), the  rook (Corvus frugilegus) in the Zhambyl district, Kazakhstan (36.6% by number) and the  American crow (Corvus brachyrhynchos) in New York and Pennsylvania (44.8% by number). Despite evidence that northern goshawks avoid nesting near common ravens (Corvus corax), the largest widespread corvid (about the same size as a goshawk at ) and a formidable opponent even one-on-one, they are even known to prey on ravens seldom. Corvids taken have ranged in size from the  Canada jay (Perisoreus canadensis) to the raven.

Pigeons and doves

In Europe, the leading prey species numerically (the main prey species in 41% of 32 European studies largely focused on the nesting season) is the  rock pigeon (Columba livia). Although the predominance of rock pigeons in urban environments that host goshawks such as the German cities of Hamburg (where they constituted 36% by number and nearly 45% by weight of the local diet) or Cologne is predictable, evidence shows that these development-clinging pigeons are sought out even within ample conserved woodland from Portugal to Georgia. In areas where goshawk restrict their hunting forays to field and forest, they often catch another numerous pigeon, the  common wood pigeon (Columba palumbus) (the largest pigeon the goshawk naturally encounters and is known to hunt). The latter species was the main prey in the diet of northern goshawks from in the Germany-Netherlands border area (37.7% of 4125 prey items) and Wales (25.1% by number and 30.5% by biomass of total prey). It has been theorized that male goshawks in peri-urban regions may be better suited with their higher agility to ambushing feral pigeons in and amongst various manmade structures whereas females may be better suited due to the higher overall speeds to taking out common wood-pigeons, as these typically forage in wood-cloaked but relatively open fields; however males are efficient predators of common wood-pigeons as well. Studies have proven that, while hunting feral pigeons, goshawks quite often select the oddly colored pigeons out of flocks as prey, whether the plumage of the flock is predominantly dark or light hued, they disproportionately often select individuals of the other color. This preference is apparently more pronounced in older, experienced goshawks and there is some evidence that the males who select oddly-colored pigeons have higher average productivity during breeding. Around eight additional species of pigeon and dove have turned up in the goshawks diet from throughout the range but only in small numbers and in most of North America, goshawks take pigeons less commonly than in Eurasia.

Gamebirds

The northern goshawk is in some parts of its range considered a specialized predator of gamebirds, particularly grouse. All told 33 species of this order have turned up in their diet, including most of the species either native to or introduced in North America and Europe. Numerically, only in the well-studied taiga habitats of Scandinavia, Canada and Alaska and some areas of the eastern United States do grouse typically take a dominant position. Elsewhere in the range, gamebirds are often secondary in number but often remain one of the most important contributors of prey biomass to nests. With their general ground-dwelling habits, gamebirds tend to be fairly easy for goshawks to overtake if they remain unseen and, if made aware of the goshawk, the prey chooses to run rather than fly. If frightened too soon, gamebirds may take flight and may be chased for some time, although the capture rates are reduced considerably when this occurs. Pre-fledgling chicks of gamebirds are particularly vulnerable due to the fact that they can only run when being pursued. In several parts of Scandinavia, forest grouse have historically been important prey for goshawks both in and out of the nesting season, principally the  black grouse (Tetrao tetrix) and the  hazel grouse (Bonasa bonasia) followed in numbers by larger  western capercaillies (Tetrao urogallus) and the  willow ptarmigan (Lagopus lagopus) which replace the other species in the lower tundra zone. The impression of goshawks on the populations of this prey is considerable, possibly the most impactful of any predator in northern Europe considering their proficiency as predators and similarity of habitat selection to forest grouse. An estimated 25-26% of adult hazel grouses in Finnish and Swedish populations in a few studies fall victim to goshawks, whereas about 14% of adult black grouse are lost to this predator. Lesser numbers were reportedly culled in one study from northern Finland. However, adult grouse are less important in the breeding season diet than young birds, an estimated 30% of grouse taken by Scandinavian goshawks in summer were neonatal chicks whereas 53% were about fledgling age, the remaining 17% being adult grouse. This is fairly different from in southeastern Alaska, where grouse are similarly as important as in Fennoscandia, as 32.1% of avian prey deliveries were adults, 14.4% were fledglings and 53.5% were nestlings.

Northern goshawks can show somewhat of a trend for females to be taken more so than males while hunting adult gamebirds, due to the larger size and more developed defenses of males (such as leg spurs present for defense and innerspecies conflicts in male of most pheasant species). Some authors have claimed this of male ring-necked pheasant (Phasianus cochilus), but these trends are not reported everywhere, as in southern Sweden equal numbers of adult male and female ring-necked pheasants, both sexes averaging , were taken. However, adult female goshawks have been reported attacking and killing cock capercaillie, mainly during winter. Similarly impressive feats of attacks on other particularly large gamebirds have been reported elsewhere in the range, including the  Altai snowcock (Tetraogallus altaicus) in Mongolia and, in at least one case, successful predation on an estimated  adult-sized young wild turkey (Meleagris gallopavo) hen in North America (by an immature female goshawk weighing approximately ), although taking adults of much larger-bodied prey like this is considered generally rare, the young chicks and poults of such prey species are likely much more often taken. At the other end of the size scale, the smallest gamebird known to be hunted by northern goshawk was the  common quail. Domestic fowl, particularly chickens (Gallus gallus domesticus) are taken occasionally, especially where wild prey populations are depleted. While other raptors are at times blamed for large numbers of attacks on fowl, goshawks are reportedly rather more likely to attack chickens during the day than other raptors and are probably the most habitual avian predator of domestic fowl, at least in the temperate-zone. Particularly large numbers of chickens have been reported in Wigry National Park, Poland (4th most regular prey species and contributing 15.3% of prey weight), Belarus and the Ukraine, being the third most regularly reported prey in the latter two.

In a study of British goshawks, the red grouse (Lagopus lagopus scotica), a race of willow ptarmigan, was found to be the leading prey species (26.2% of prey by number). In La Segarra, Spain, the  red-legged partridge (Alectoris rufa) is the most commonly reported prey species (just over 18% by number and 24.5% by weight). Despite reports that grouse are less significant as prey to American goshawks, the  ruffed grouse (Bonasa umbellus) is one of the most important prey species in North America (fourth most reported prey species in 22 studies), having been the leading prey species for goshawks in studies from New York, New Jersey and Connecticut (from 12 to 25% of prey selected) and reported as taken in high numbers elsewhere in several parts of their mutual range.  The  sooty grouse (Dendragapus fuliginosus) was reported as the leading prey species in southern Alaska (28.4% by number). In the boreal forests of Alberta, grouse are fairly important prey especially in winter.

Squirrels

Among mammalian prey, indisputably the most significant by number are the squirrels. All told, 44 members of the Sciuridae have turned up in their foods. Tree squirrels are the most obviously co-habitants with goshawks and are indeed taken in high numbers. Alongside martens, northern goshawks are perhaps the most efficient temperate-zone predators of tree squirrels. Goshawks are large and powerful enough to overtake even the heaviest tree squirrels unlike smaller Accipiters and have greater agility and endurance in pursuits than do most buteonine hawks, some of which like red-tailed hawks (Buteo jamaicensis) regularly pursue tree squirrels but have relatively low hunting success rates due to the agility of squirrels. The  red squirrel (Sciurus vulgaris) of Eurasia is the most numerous mammalian prey in European studies and the sixth most often recorded prey species there overall. In Oulu, Finland during winter (24.6% by number), in Białowieża Forest, Poland (14.3%), in the Chřiby uplands of the Czech Republic (8.5%) and in Forêt de Bercé, France  (12%) the red squirrel was the main prey species for goshawks. In North America, tree squirrels are even more significant as prey, particularly the modestly-sized pine squirrels which are the single most important prey type for American goshawks overall. Particularly the  American red squirrel (Tamiasciurus hudsonicus) is significant, being the primary prey in studies from Minnesota, South Dakota, Wyoming and Montana (in each comprising more than 30% of the diet and present in more than half of known pellets) but also reported everywhere in their foods from the eastern United States to Alaska and Arizona. Much like the American marten (Martes americana), the American distribution of goshawks is largely concurrent with that of American red squirrels, indicating the particular significance of it as a dietary staple. In the Pacific northwest, the  Douglas squirrel (Tamiasciurus douglasii) replaces the red squirrel in both distribution and as the highest contributor to goshawk diets from northern California to British Columbia. The largest occurrence of Douglas squirrel known was from Lake Tahoe, where they constituted 23% of prey by number and 32.9% by weight.

Larger tree squirrels are also taken opportunistically, in New York, New Jersey and Connecticut, the  eastern gray squirrel (Sciurus carolinensis) was the third most significant prey species. Ground squirrels are also important prey species, mostly in North America, 25 of 44 of squirrel species found in the diet are ground squirrels. Particularly widely reported as a secondary food staple from Oregon, Wyoming, California and Arizona was the  golden-mantled ground squirrel (Callospermophilus lateralis). In Nevada and Idaho’s Sawtooth National Forest, the  Belding's ground squirrel (Urocitellus beldingi) fully dominated the food spectrum, comprising up to 74.3% of the prey by number and 84.2% by biomass. Even much bigger ground squirrels such as prairie dogs and marmots are attacked on occasion. Several hoary marmots (Marmota caligala) were brought to nests in southeast Alaska but averaged only , so were young animals about half of the average adult (spring) weight (albeit still considerably heavier than the goshawks who took them). About a dozen species of chipmunk are known to be taken by goshawks and the  eastern chipmunks (Tamias striatus) were the second most numerous prey species at nests in central New York and Minnesota. Squirrels taken have ranged in size from the  least chipmunk (Tamias minimus) to the aforementioned adult marmots.

Hares and rabbits

Northern goshawks can be locally heavy predators of lagomorphs, of which they take at least 15 species as prey. Especially in the Iberian peninsula, the native European rabbit (Oryctolagus cuniculus) is often delivered to nests and can be the most numerous prey. Even where taken secondarily in numbers in Spain to gamebirds such as in La Segarra, Spain, rabbits tend to be the most significant contributor of biomass to goshawk nests. In England, where the European rabbit is an introduced species, it was the third most numerous prey species at nests. In more snowbound areas where wild and feral rabbits are absent, larger hares may be taken and while perhaps more difficult to subdue than most typical goshawk prey, are a highly nutritious food source. In Finland, females were found to take mountain hare (Lepus timidus) fairly often and they were the second most numerous prey item for goshawks in winter (14.8% by number). In North America, where mammals are more important in the diet, more lagomorphs are taken. In Oregon, snowshoe hares (Lepus americanus) are the largest contributor of biomass to goshawks foods (making up to 36.6% of the prey by weight), in eastern Oregon at least 60% of hares taken were adults weighing on average , and in one of three studies from Oregon be the most numerous prey species (second most numerous in the other two). This species was also the second most numerous food species in Alberta throughout the year and the most important prey by weight. Eastern cottontails are also taken regularly in New York and Pennsylvania. In some parts of the range, larger leporids may be attacked, extending to the  black-tailed (Lepus californicus) and the  white-tailed jackrabbit (Lepus townsendii), the   European hares (Lepus europaeus), as well as the mountain hare. Despite historic claims that taking prey so considerably larger than themselves is exceptional beyond a small region of Fennoscandia, there is evidence that as grouse numbers have mysteriously declined since 1960, adult mountain hare are increasingly the leading prey for wintering female goshawks, favoring and causing an increase of larger bodied females in order to overpower such a substantial catch. Asian and American goshawks also take about a half dozen species of pikas, much smaller cousins of rabbits and hares, but they are at best supplementary prey for American goshawks and of unknown importance to little-studied Asian populations.

Other birds

Some 21 species of woodpecker have been reported from northern goshawk food studies around the world. With their relatively slow, undulating flight adult and fledged woodpeckers can easily be overtaken by hunting goshawks, not to mention their habitat preferences frequently put them within active goshawk ranges. Most of the widespread species from Europe and North America have been observed as prey, most commonly relatively large woodpeckers such as the  greater spotted woodpecker (Dendrocopos major) and the  European green woodpecker (Picus viridis) in Europe and the  northern flicker (Colaptes auratus) in North America. Indeed, the flicker is the third most regularly reported prey species in America. In south-central Wyoming, the northern flicker was the second most numerous prey species and it was the main prey species in a study from New Mexico (here making up 26.4% of prey by number). All sizes of woodpeckers available are taken from the  lesser spotted woodpecker (Dryobates minor) to the  black woodpecker (Dryocopus martius) in Europe and from the  downy woodpecker (Picoides pubescens) to the  pileated woodpecker (Dryocopus pileatus) in North America. In many areas, northern goshawks will pursue water birds of several varieties, although they rarely form a large portion of the diet. Perhaps the most often recorded water birds in the diet are ducks. All told, 32 waterfowl have been recorded in their diet. In the Ural mountains, the nearly cosmopolitan  mallard (Anas platyrhynchos) was third most numerous prey species. The ducks of the genus Aythya are somewhat frequently recorded as well, especially since their tree-nesting habits may frequently put them in the hunting range of nesting goshawks. Similarly, the wood duck (Aix sponsa) from America and the mandarin duck (Aix galericulata) from Asia may be more vulnerable than most waterfowl at their tree nests. Although etymologists feel that the goshawk is an abbreviation of “goose-hawk”, geese are seldom taken considering their generally much larger size. Nonetheless, four species have been taken, including adults of species as large as the  greater white-fronted goose (Anser albifrons). Various other water birds reported as taken include red-throated loon (Gavia stellata) chicks, adult little grebes (Tachybaptus ruficollis), adult great cormorants (Phalacrocorax carbo) (about the same size as a greater white-fronted goose), adult crested ibis (Nipponia nippon), black stork (Ciconia nigra) chicks and five species each of heron and rail. Among shorebirds (or small waders), goshawks have been reported preying on more than 22 sandpipers, more than 8 plovers, more than 10 species each of gull and tern, more than 2 species of alcids and the Eurasian stone-curlew (Burhinus oedicnemus), the Eurasian oystercatcher (Haematopus ostralegus) and the long-tailed jaeger (Stercorarius longicaudus). 

Corvids as aforementioned are quite important prey. Although they take fewer passerines than other northern Accipiters, smaller types of songbirds can still be regionally important to the diet. This is especially true of the thrushes which are often delivered to nests in Europe. 17 species of thrush have been identified in goshawk food across their range. The numerous  Eurasian blackbird (Turdus merula) is often most reported from this family and can even be the main prey at some locations such as in the Netherlands (23.5% of prey by number) and in Norway (just over 14% by number and two studies showed thrushes collectively make up nearly half of the prey items in Norwegian nests). All common Turdus species are taken in some numbers in Europe, being quite regular and conspicuous in the woodland edge zones most often patrolled by male goshawks, especially while singing in spring and summer. Even where larger, more nutritious prey is present such as at pheasant release sites, the abundant thrushes are more often delivered to the nest because of the ease of capture such as in Norway. Smaller numbers of thrush are taken in general in North America but the  American robin (Turdus migratorius) are fairly regular prey nonetheless and were the most numerous prey in the Sierra Nevadas of California (30.7% by number and 21.4% by weight). Thrush taken have ranged in size from the  western bluebird (Sialia mexicana), the smallest bluebird and lightest North American thrush on average, to the  mistle thrush (Turdus viscivorus), Europe's largest thrush. Beyond corvids and thrushes, most passerines encountered by northern goshawks are substantially smaller and are often ignored under most circumstances in favor of more sizable prey. Nonetheless, more than a hundred passerines have been recorded their diet beyond these families. Most widespread passerine families from North America and Europe have occasional losses to goshawks, including tyrant flycatchers, shrikes, vireos, larks, swallows, nuthatches, treecreepers, wrens, mimids, Old World warblers, Old World flycatchers, pipits and wagtails, starlings, waxwings, New World warblers, emberizine sparrows, cardinalids, icterids, finches and Old World sparrows. Avian prey has even ranged to as small as the  goldcrest (Regulus regulus), the smallest bird in Europe. In North America, the smallest known bird prey is the  American redstart (Setophaga ruticilla). Among smaller types of passerines, one of the most widely reported are finches and, in some widespread studies, somewhat substantial numbers of finches of many species may actually be taken. Finches tend to fly more conspicuously as they cover longer distances, often bounding or undulating as they do, over the canopy than most forest songbirds, which may make them more susceptible to goshawk attacks than other small songbirds. Non-passerine upland birds taken by goshawks in small numbers include but are not limited to nightjars, swifts, bee-eaters, kingfishers, rollers, hoopoes and parrots.

Other mammals

Outside of the squirrel family, relatively few other types of rodents are taken in many regions. In eastern Oregon, the  northern flying squirrel (Glaucomys sabrinus) was the third or fourth most frequently caught prey species. Microtine rodents which are so essential to most northern non-accipiter hawks and a majority of owls are at best a secondary contributor to goshawk diets, even though 26 species have been reported in their diet. Exceptionally, in a study of the Carpathian mountains of Ukraine, the  common vole (Microtus arvalis) was the second most numerous prey species. Relatively high numbers of the  bank vole (Clethrionomys glareolus) were reported in diets from Poland in Gmina Sobótka and the Białowieża Forest. During summer in Alberta, the  meadow vole (Microtus pennsylvanicus) was the third most frequently reported prey species, the only known study where large numbers of microtine rodents were taken in North America. Microtine rodents taken by goshawks have ranged in size from the  western harvest mouse (Reithrodontomys megalotis) to the  muskrat (Ondatra zibethicus). Other miscellaneous rodents reported sporadically in the diet include dormice, porcupines, kangaroo rats, mountain beavers (Aplodontia rufa), jumping mice, Old World mice and rats, zokors, gophers and jirds.

Insectivores are taken in low numbers including moles, shrews and hedgehogs. The smallest mammalian prey species known to be attacked by goshawks was the  masked shrew (Sorex cinereus). Even more sporadically attacked by goshawks, given this prey's nocturnal habits, are bats. In one case a juvenile golden snub-nosed monkey (Rhinopithecus roxellana), which was successfully taken by a goshawk. Ungulates such as deer and sheep are sometimes consumed by goshawks but there is no evidence that they prey on live ones (as much larger accipitrids such as eagles can sometimes do), but these are more likely rare cases of scavenging on carrion, which may more regularly occur than once thought in areas with harsh winter weather.

Alternative prey
In a few cases, northern goshawks have been recorded hunting and killing prey beyond birds and mammals. In some of the warmer drier extensions of their range, reptiles may be available to them to hunt. The only known location in the northern goshawk's range where reptiles were taken in large numbers was Sierra de Guadarrama, Spain, where the  ocellated lizard (Timon lepidus) was the second most numerous prey species. Amphibians are even rarer in the diet, only recorded more than singly in one study each from Spain and from England. Fish are similarly rare in the diet, recorded twice each in Bavaria and Belarus. A few pellets have included remains of insects, much of which may be ingested incidentally or via the stomachs of birds that they have consumed. However, there is some evidence they at times will hunt large ground-dwelling insects such as dung beetles.

Interspecies predatory relationships

Northern goshawks are often near the top of the avian food chain in forested biomes but face competition for food resources from various other predators, including both birds and mammals. Comparative dietary studies have shown that mean sizes of prey, both in terms of its size relative to the raptor itself and absolute weight, for goshawks is relatively larger than in most buteonine hawks in North America and Europe. Studies show even buteonine hawks slightly larger than goshawks on average take prey weighing less than  whereas average goshawk prey is usually well over such a mass. This is due largely to the much higher importance of microtine rodents to most buteonine hawks, which, despite their occasional abundance, are ignored by goshawks in most regions. Similarly, mean prey mass for sharp-shinned and Cooper's hawks in North America is between about 10 and 30% of their own mass, whereas the mean prey of American goshawks is between about 25 and 50% of their own mass and therefore are the goshawks takes prey that is on average relatively much larger. In many of the ecosystems that they inhabit, northern goshawks compete with resources with other predators, particularly where they take sizeable numbers of lagomorphs. About a dozen mammalian and avian predators in each area all primarily consume European rabbits and snowshoe hares alongside goshawks in the Iberian peninsula and the American boreal forest regions where these became primary staple foods. Like those co-habitant predators, the goshawk suffers declines during the low portion in the lagomorph's breeding cycles, which rise and fall cyclically every 10 to 12 years. However, even where these are primary food sources, the northern goshawk is less specialized than many (even Bubo owls, some of the more generalist avian predators become extremely specialized lagomorph hunters locally, to a greater extent than goshawks) and can alternate their food selection, often taking equal or greater numbers of tree squirrels and woodland birds. Due to this dietary variation, the northern goshawk is less affected than other raptorial birds by prey population cycles and tends to not be depleted by resource competition.

Despite their propensity to pursue relatively large prey and capability to pursue alternate prey, northern goshawks can be locally outcompeted for resources by species that are more adaptable and flexible, especially in terms of habitat and prey. Most northern buteonine hawks largely take small rodents such as voles (which are usually ignored by goshawks) but can adapt to nearly any other type of prey when the staple local rodent prey populations go down. Comparisons with goshawks and red-tailed hawk nesting in abutting areas of Arizona (other large common Buteos like Swainson's hawks (Buteo swainsonii) and ferruginous hawks (Buteo regalis) utilize open habitats and so do not come into conflict with goshawks) shows the red-tailed hawks as being able to take a broader range of prey than goshawks and nest in more varied habitats, the latter species being perhaps the most commonly seen, widespread and adaptable of diurnal American raptors. On occasion, goshawks are robbed of their prey by a diversity of other birds, including harriers, other hawks, eagles, falcons and even gulls.

Northern goshawks from North America are less prone to nesting outside of mature forests and take larger numbers of mammals as opposed to abundant birds than in Europe. This may be in part due to heavier competition from a greater diversity of raptors in North America. In Europe, the goshawk only co-exists with the much smaller sparrowhawk within its own genus, while in North America, it lives with the intermediately-sized Cooper's hawk. The latter species much more readily nests in semi-open and developed areas of North America than goshawks there and hunts a broad assemblage of medium-sized birds, whereas such prey is more readily available to male goshawks from Europe than to goshawks in North America. Although the Cooper's hawk usually avoids and loses individual contests against the larger goshawk, its adaptability has allowed it to become the most widespread and commonly found North American Accipiter. The slightly larger goshawks of Europe have been shown, in some but not all areas, to outcompete and possibly lower productivity of the slightly smaller common buzzard (Buteo buteo) when their ranges overlap. Usually, however, the dietary habits and nesting preferences are sufficiently distinct and thus effect neither buzzard or goshawk populations. Both can mutually be very common even when the other is present. On the other hand, American goshawks are slightly smaller on average than their European counterparts and can be up to 10% smaller in mass than red-tailed hawks. However, studies have indicated that the goshawk has, beyond its superior speed and agility, has stronger feet and a more forceful attack than that of the red-tailed hawk. All in all, individual competitions between red-tailed hawks and goshawks can go either way and neither is strongly likely to deter the other from nesting given their distinct nesting habitats. Other raptors, including most medium to large-sized owls as well as red-tailed hawks and falcons, will use nests built by northern goshawks, even when goshawks are still in the area.

To many other raptorial birds, the northern goshawk is more significant as a predatory threat than as competition. The northern goshawk is one of the most dangerous species to other raptors, especially to those considerably smaller than itself. In many cases, raptors of any age from nestlings to adults are taken around their nests but free-flying raptors too are readily taken or ambushed at a perch. In the Veluwe province of the Netherlands, the percentage of nest of European honey buzzards (Pernis apivorus), weighing on average , predated by goshawks increased from a little as 7.7% in 1981–1990 to 33% in 2000–2004. As their habitat preferences may overlap with goshawks, all other Accipiters encountered may be predated in multiple cases, including the  Eurasian sparrowhawk, the  levant sparrowhawk (Accipiter brevipes), the  sharp-shinned hawk, the  Japanese sparrowhawk (Accipiter gularis) and the  Cooper's hawk.

Other assorted accipitrids of up to their own size to be predated by goshawks include the  black kite (Milvus migrans), the  red kite (Milvus milvus), the  western marsh-harrier (Circus aeruginosus), the  Montagu's harrier (Circus pygargus), the  pallid harrier (Circus macrourus), the  booted eagle (Hieraaetus pennatus) and Buteos of up to adults including the  common buzzard, the  broad-winged hawk (Buteo platypterus), the  red-shouldered hawk (Buteo lineatus) and the  red-tailed hawk. Even raptors somewhat larger than a northern goshawks have been considered as prey, although it is not clear whether adults are among the victims, including the  osprey (Pandion haliaetus),  crested honey-buzzard (Pernis ptilorhynchus) and the  lesser spotted eagle (Clanga pomarina).

Outside of the accipitrid group, heavy predation on different varieties of raptorial birds by northern goshawks can continue unabated. Many types of owl are taken and in Europe, the northern goshawk is the second most prolific predator of owls behind the Eurasian eagle owl (Bubo bubo). In the Białowieża Forest of Poland, fairly high numbers of the  tawny owl (Strix alucco) were taken. Whether adults have ever been killed as prey though is unknown but goshawks have been known to kill great horned owls that they've found near their nests. In addition, about eight species of falcon have been identified in the foods of goshawks. Adult falcons of small species such as kestrels and merlins (Falco columbarius) can be overpowered quite easily if they can manage to surprise the prey. Larger falcons have turned up in the diet as well, including the  prairie falcon (Falco mexicanus) and the  saker falcon (Falco cherrug), although possible only nestlings of these species. Brief aerial skirmishes between goshawks and peregrine falcons (Falco peregrinus) have been described but neither species is known to have killed one another in the wild. In Schleswig-Holstein, Germany, at least four small passerines species were recorded as nesting close to active goshawk nest, due to the incidental shelter that the fierce goshawks inadvertently provides from smaller raptors which are their main predators. Such raptors, including Eurasian kestrels, Eurasian sparrowhawks and long-eared owls, not only avoid goshawk activity where possible but also were found to have lower nest productivity any time they nested relatively close to goshawks per the study. A similar phenomenon, with goshawks inadvertently providing shelter to small passerines, has been recorded in North America as well.

Competition for northern goshawks can also come from mammalian carnivores. Martens, and to a lesser extent other weasels, are presumably one of their more major competitors as their diet often consists of similar prey primarily during spring and summer, tree squirrels and woodland birds, but little has been studied in terms of how the two types of predator effect each other. Most recorded interactions have been predatory, as the goshawk has been recorded preying on a dozen species, from the  least weasel (Mustela nivalis) to the  stone marten (Martes foina). Northern goshawks have also been recorded as feeding on much bigger predators such as the  red fox (Vulpes vulpes), the  raccoon dog (Nyctereutes procyonoides) and the  striped skunk (Mephitis mephitis), but it is not clear whether these were actual kills, as many may be encountered as already dead carrion. Domestic carnivores are sometimes eaten, including dogs and cats, the latter of which has reportedly been taken alive by goshawks. The red fox is a surprisingly considerable competitor for resources with northern goshawks. It was found in Norway that goshawk numbers were higher when voles were at peak numbers, not due to voles as a food source but because foxes were more likely to eat the rodents and ignore grouse, whereas during low vole numbers the foxes are more likely to compete with goshawks over grouse as prey. A decrease of the fox population of Norway due to sarcoptic mange was found result in an increase of grouse numbers and, in turn, northern goshawks. In some areas, red foxes have been found to steal up to half of the goshawks’ kills.

Unlike the predators at the top of the avian food chain such as eagles and the largest owls, which are rarely endangered by predation as adults, the northern goshawk is itself susceptible to a fairly extensive range of predators. The most deadly are likely to be the Eurasian eagle owl and the great horned owl, which not only predate goshawks of any age and at any season but also opportunistically take over their own prior nests as their own nesting site. Of the two, the American horned owl nesting habits are more similar to goshawks, which most often consists of tree nests whereas the eagle owl usually nests in rock formations. Thus, the northern goshawk is more likely to victimized by the great horned owls, which can stage nightly ambushes and destroy an entire goshawk family as they pick off both adults and nestlings. In radio-tagging studies of adult and immature goshawks in the Great Lakes region and Arizona, up to half of the studied birds were killed by great horned owls at night, while the horned owls accounted for 40% of the nest failures in studies from Arizona and New Mexico. In comparison, in Schleswig-Holstein, 59% of reintroduced eagle owls used nests built by goshawks and no goshawk pairs could successfully nest within  of an active eagle-owl nest. 18% of nest failures here positively were attributed to eagle owl predation, with another 8% likely due to eagle-owls. Other larger raptorial birds can threaten them. The golden eagle (Aquila chrysaetos) and the bald eagle (Haliaeetus leucocephalus) in North America, have killed wintering goshawks, but given the discrepancy in their habitat preferences, such cases are presumably rare. Other avian predators known to have successfully preyed on goshawks including adults (usually in singular cases) include white-tailed eagles (Haliaeetus albicilla), Bonelli's eagles (Aquila fasciata), eastern imperial eagles (Aquila heliaca), snowy owls (Bubo scandiacus), Ural owls (Strix uralensis) and red-tailed hawks.

The same mammalian predators that sometimes compete for food with northern goshawks also sometimes kill them, with the nestlings, fledglings and brooding females, all with impaired flight due to their wing feather moults, seemingly the most vulnerable. In Chequamegon-Nicolet National Forest of Wisconsin, the main source of mortality for northern goshawks are reintroduced fishers (Pekania pennanti), which are capable of killing many chicks, fledglings and brooding females. In contrast, in Europe, the pine marten (Martes martes) has only been known to prey on young goshawks still in the nest and not adults. Other mammals capable of climbing trees have been observed or inferred to predate goshawks, either mostly or entirely young in the nests, including wolverines (Gulo gulo), North American porcupines (Erethizon dorsatum), raccoons (Procyon lotor), bobcats (Lynx rufus) and American black bears (Ursus americanus). Overall, the range of nest predators is more extensive in North America than in Eurasia, in the latter continent most recorded nest depredations are by eagle owls, with martens and corvids usually only preying on goshawk nestlings when low food supplies cause the goshawks to have lower nest attendance (and presumably effect these predators to the extent that they take the risk of coming to the goshawk nest). Fledgling goshawks are also vulnerable to canids such as coyotes (Canis latrans), gray wolves (Canis lupus) and red foxes (Vulpes vulpes) as they may perch lower to the ground and are clumsier, more unsteady and less cautious than older birds. In one case, a goshawk that was ambushed and killed at a kill by a mangy vixen fox was able to lethally slash the windpipe of the fox, which apparently died moments after partially consuming the goshawk.

Apart from aforementioned predation events, northern goshawks have at times been killed by non-predators, including prey that turned the tables on their pursuer, as well as in hunting accidents. In one case, a huge group (or murder) of hooded crows heavily mobbed a goshawk that they caught in a relatively open spot, resulting in a prolonged attack that ended up killing the goshawk. In another instance, a goshawk drowned while attempting to capture a tufted duck (Aythya fuligula). One young goshawk managed to escape a red fox that had caught it with a chewed wing, only to drown in a nearby creek. Another, and rather gruesome, hunting mishap occurred when a goshawk caught a large mountain hare and, while attempting to hold it in place by grasping vegetation with its other foot, was torn in half.

Breeding

The northern goshawk is one of the most extensively studied raptors in terms of its breeding habits. Adult goshawks return to their breeding grounds usually between March and April, but locally as early as February. If prey levels remain high, adults may remain on their breeding ground all year. Courtship flights, calls and even nest building has been recorded in Finland exceptionally in September and October right after young dispersed, whereas in most of Fennoscandia, breeding does not commence any earlier than March and even then only when it is a warm spring. Most breeding activity occurs between April and July, exceptionally a month earlier or later. Even in most areas of Alaska, most pairs have produced young by May. Courtship flights typical are above the canopy on sunny, relatively windless days in early spring with the goshawks’ long main tail feathers held together and the undertail coverts spread so wide to give them an appearance of having a short, broad-tail with a long dark strip extending from the center. One study found undulating display flights more than three times more often done by males than females. After display flights have concluded, the male typically brings a prepared fresh prey item to the female as part of the courtship. In general, these displays are presumably to show (or reinforce) to the potential mate their health and prowess as breeding partner. Copulation is brief and frequent, ranging up to nearly 520 times per clutch (on average about 10 times a day or 100-300 throughout the season), and may be the male's way of ensuring paternity since he is frequently away gathering food by the time of egg-laying, although extra-pair copulation is extremely rare. Female solicits copulations by facing away from male with drooped wings and flared tail-coverts. The male, wings drooped and tail-coverts flared, drops from a branch to gain momentum, then swoops upward and mounts her back. Both birds usually call while mating. Fidelity studies from Europe show that about 80–90% of adult females breed with the same male in consecutive years, whereas up to 96% of males mate with the same female in consecutive years. In California, 72% of males retained relationship with the same mates in consecutive years while 70% of females did the same. Males intruding in Hamburg, Germany territories were in some cases not evicted and ended up mating with the female, with the male of the pair not stopping it. In migratory, northernmost populations, mate retention in consecutive years is low. Males are sometimes killed by females during courtship and encounters can be dangerous especially if he does not bring food to courtship and he often seems nervous withdrawing with a trill at a given chance.

Nest characteristics

Nesting areas are indefinite, a nest may be used for several years, also a nest built years prior may be used or an entirely new nest may be constructed. When nest constructing, the pair will often roost together. Males construct most new nests but females may assist somewhat if reinforcing old nests. While the male is building, the female perches in the vicinity, occasionally screaming, sometimes flying to inspect the nest. At other times, the female may take a more active role, or even the primary one, in new nest construction and this is subject to considerable individual variation. For the nesting tree, more than 20 species of conifer have been used including spruce, fir, larch, pine and hemlock. Broadleaf trees used including ash, alder, aspen, beech, birch, elm, hickory, hornbeam, lime, maple (including sycamore), oak, poplar, tamarack, wild cherry and willow. In some areas, the nests may be lined with hard pieces of bark and also with green sprigs of conifers. Often the tallest tree in a given stand is selected as the nest tree and this is often the dominant tree species within the given region and forest. Therefore, hardwood trees are usually used as the nesting tree in the eastern United States while conifers are usually used in the western United States. In some studies from North America up to 15% of nests are in dead trees but this is far rarer in Eurasia. More significant than species is the maturity and height of the nesting tree, its structure (which should have ample surface around the main fork) and, perhaps most significantly, little to no understory below it. Multiple studies note the habit of nests being built in forests close to clear-fellings, swamps and heaths, lakes and meadows, roads (especially light-use logging dirt roads), railways and swathes cut along power cables, usually near such openings there'd be prominent boulders, stones or roots of fallen trees or low branches to use as plucking points. Canopy cover averaged between 60 and 96% in Europe. As is typical in widely distributed raptors from temperate-zones, those from cold regions faced south, 65% in Alaska, 54% in Norway and also in high latitudes such as sky-forests of the Arizona Rockies, otherwise usually nests face north and east.

Northern goshawks may adopt nests of other species, common buzzards contributed 5% of nests used in Schleswig-Holstein, including unusually exposed ones on edges of woods and another 2% were built by common ravens or carrion crows, but 93% were built by the goshawks themselves. While colonizing peri-urban areas in Europe, they may displace Eurasian sparrowhawks not only from their territories but may actually try to use overly small sparrowhawk nests, usually resulting in nest collapse. One nest was used continuously by different pairs for a period of 17 years. A single pair may maintain up to several nests, usually up to two will occur in an area of no more than a few hundred meters. One nest may be used in sequential years, but often an alternate is selected. During an 18-year-study from Germany, many alternate nests were used, 27 pairs had two, 10 had 3, 5 had 4, one had five and one pair had as many as 11. Other regions where pairs had on average two nests were Poland, California and Arizona’s Kaibab Plateau. The extent of use of alternate nests is unknown as well as their benefit, but they may reduce significant levels of parasites and diseases within the nest. In central Europe, the goshawk's nest area can be as small  of woods and less than 10 hectares are commonplace.

Eggs
The eggs are laid at 2- to 3-day intervals on average between April and June (usually May), taking up to 9 days for a clutch of 3–4 and 11 days for a clutch of 5. The eggs are rough, unmarked pale bluish or dirty white. In Spanish eggs, the average dimensions were  compared to  German ones, which averaged . Goshawks from Lapland, Finland lay the  largest known eggs at  x , while other Finnish goshawk eggs ranged from  x . Clutch size almost always averages between 2 and 4 eggs, with a median around 3, rarely as few as 1 or as many 5–6 will be laid. In combination spring weather and prey population levels seem to drive both egg laying dates and clutch size. If an entire clutch is lost, a replacement can be laid within 15 to 30 days.

Parental behaviour

During incubation, females tend to become quieter and more inconspicuous. She may turn the eggs as frequently as every 30 to 60 minutes. Males may incubate as many as 1 to 3 hours, but usually less than an hour, early in incubation but rarely do so later on. During daylight females can do as much as 96% of the observed incubation. The incubation stage last for any time between 28 and 37 days (rarely up to 41 days in exceptionally big clutches), varying in different parts of the range. After hatching occurs, the male does not come directly to the nest but instead just delivers food (usually already plucked, beheaded or otherwise dismembered) to a branch near the nest which the female tears apart and shares between herself and the nestlings. Food deliveries by the male can be daily or as infrequent as every 3 to 5 days. In turn, the female must feed the young about twice a day in order for the chicks to avoid starvation. Caching of food has been recorded near the nest, but only before the young start feeding themselves. Females will also start capturing prey later on, but usually only after the young have already fledged. In Europe, female goshawks may press down on their nest if a human approaches, others may unobtrusively leave the nest, although are more reluctant to leave the nest late in incubation. In North America, the behavior of parent goshawks differs, as they often vigorously defend their territories fiercely from all intruders, including passing humans. The northern goshawk has a reputation as the most aggressive American raptor when the vicinity of their nest is approached. Here, when the nest is approached (especially soon after hatching) the goshawk will engage in their defensive kakking vocal display accompanied by exaggerated swooping in flight which quickly phases into a violent attack, potentially causing painful (but usually minor) injuries and blood loss. Research has indicated that attacks on humans are mostly done by adult females (more than 80% of the time) and are rarely pressed unless a person is by themselves. However, large groups and loud noise can appear to irritate the female and may cause her to attack the next lone person who comes near the nest. The higher aggression towards humans in North America than in Europe has been linked to both a more extensive range of potential nest predators for American goshawks causing them to develop a more aggressive display or the lower rates of persecution in America than in Europe, which may account for the relative shyness in the latter continent. Occasionally, both males and females have been recorded abandoning the nest and their mates. There are a few rare cases where males successfully reared up to 4 young after the female abandoned the nest or was killed between the 2 and 3rd week. Otherwise male will continue delivering prey but without the female all the nestlings will starve to death and the food simply rots. In cases where the male abandons the female and the brood, she may be able to successfully brood but usually only one nestling is likely to survive to fledge without the male's contribution of prey. At other times the mother may be replaced, sometimes forcefully, by another female, usually an older mature one. Exceptional cases of polygamy, with a male mating with two females, have been reported in Germany and The Netherlands and typically these breeding attempts fail.

Hatching and development

Hatching is asynchronous but not completely, usually an average sized clutch takes only 2 to 3 days to hatch, although it may take up to 6 days to hatch a clutch of more than 4 eggs. Hatchlings start calling from within the shell as much as 38 hours before hatching, as a faint chep, chep, chack, peep, peep, peep may be heard. The young are covered with down and altricial (as are all raptors) at first but develop rapidly. The mothers typically brood the nestlings intensively for about two weeks, around the time grayer feathers start to develop through the nestlings’ down. The most key time for development may be at three weeks when the nestlings can stand a bit and start to develop their flight feathers. Also at the three-week stage, they can reach about half the adults’ weight and females start to noticeably outgrow the males. However, this growth requires increased food delivery so frequently results in lower nest attendance and, in turn, higher predation rates. Also rates of starvation at this stage can exceed 50% especially in the youngest of large clutches of 4 to 5. Nestlings at 4 weeks are starting to develop strong flight feathers, which they frequently flap; also they can start to pull on food but are still mainly fed by female and begin to make a whistling scream when she goes to fetch food from the male. More active feeding behavior by nestlings may increase their aggression towards each other. By the 5th week, they've developed many typical goshawk behaviors, sometimes mantling over food, testing balance by extending one leg and one wing at edge of nest (called "warbling" by falconers) and can wag their tails vigorously. Starvation risk also increases at this point due to their growing demands and, due to their incessant begging calls, vocal activity may court predators. In 6th week, they become "branchers", although still spend much of the time by the nest, especially by the edge. The young goshawks "play" by seizing and striking violent at a perch or by yanking off leaves and tossing them over their back. Wing feathers do not develop highly dimorphically, but male branchers are better developed than females who have more growing to do and can leave the nest up to 1–3 days sooner. The young rarely return to the nest after being 35 to 46 days of age and start their first flight another 10 days later, thus becoming full fledglings. Goshawk nestlings frequently engage in “runting”, wherein the older siblings push aside and call more loudly and are thus are feed more often at food deliveries, until the younger siblings may either starve to death, be trampled or killed by their siblings (referred to as siblicide or “cainism”). There is some evidence that mother goshawks may lessen the effects of runting by delaying incubation until their last eggs are laid. Food supply may be linked to higher rates of siblicides and, in many locations with consistent prey levels, runting and siblicide can occur somewhat seldom (meaning the northern goshawk is a “facultative” rather than “obligate cainist”). Nonetheless, either by predation, starvation or siblicide, few nests produce more than 2 to 3 fledglings. One pair in North America was able to successfully fledge all four of its young. Somewhat larger numbers of female fledglings are produced in Europe with their larger size, but the opposite is true in North America where sexual dimorphism is less pronounced. When food supplies are very high, though, European goshawks actually can produce somewhat more males than females.

At about 50 days old, the young goshawks may start hunting on their own but more often eat carrion either provided by parents or biologists. Most fledglings stay within  of the nest at 65 days of age but can wander up to  before dispersal at between 65 and 80 days old in sync with the full development of their flight feathers. Between 65 and 90 days after hatching, more or less all young goshawks become independent. There is no evidence that parents aggressively displace the young in the fall (as other raptorial birds have sometimes been reported to do), therefore the young birds seek independence on their own. Goshawk siblings are not cohesive together past 65 days, except for some lingering young females, whereas common buzzard broods are not recorded at their nests after 65 days but remain strongly cohesive with each other. 5% of radio-tagged young in Gotland, Sweden (entirely males) were found to disperse to another breeding area and join a different brood as soon as their flight feathers were developed enough. These seem to be cases of moving to a better food area. Parents and adoptive young seem to tolerate this, although parents do not seem to be able to tell the difference between their own and other young. It is only after dispersal that goshawks typically start to hunt and seem to drink more often than older birds, sometimes spend up to an hour bathing.

Breeding success rates
Nest success averages between 80 and 95% in terms of the number of nests that produce fledglings, with an average number of 2 to 3 fledglings per nest. About equal numbers of eggs and nestlings may be lost (6% lost in each the incubation and brooding periods per a study from Arizona) but according to a study from Spain large clutches of 4 to 5 had higher losses overall than medium-sized clutches of 2 to nearly 4. Total losses averaged 36% in Spain across clutches of 2–5. Similar results were found in Germany, with similar numbers of fledglings produced in very large clutches (more than 4) as in medium-sized ones (2–4). A grading of success from a study in Sweden found categories of competent and less competent pairs, with losses averaging 7% and 17% in these two groups, respectively. Studies from Finland and the Yukon Territory found that average number of fledglings varied dramatically based on food supply based on the cyclical nature of most prey in these northern areas, varying from average success rates of 0 to 3.9 fledglings in the latter region. Similar wide variations in breeding success in correlation to prey levels were noted at other areas, including Nevada (where the number of fledglings could be up to seven times higher when lagomorphs were at their population peaks) and Wisconsin.

Nesting failure
Poor weather, which consists of cold springs that bear late cold spells, snow, and freezing rain, causes many nests to fail, and may also hamper courtship and lower brood size and overall breeding attempts. However, the most important cause of nest failure was found to be nest destruction by humans and other predations, starvation, then bad weather and collapse of nests in declining order. On average, humans are responsible based on known studies for about 17% of nest failures in Europe. 32% of 97 nestlings in Bavaria, Germany died because of human activities, while 59% of 111 broods in England failed due to this factor. Low food supplies are linked to predation, as it seems to cause greater risk of predation due to the lower nest attendance. Lower densities of pairs may actually increase nesting success, as per studies from Finland where the highest median clutch size, at 3.8, was in the area with the lowest densities. Age may also play a factor in nest success, pairings where one mate is not fully mature (usually the female, as males rarely breed before attaining adult plumage) is less than half as successful as ones where both were mature, based on studies from Arizona. Overall, males do not normally breed at any younger than 3 years of age (although they are in adult plumage by two years) and females can breed at as young as 1 to 2 years old, but rarely produce successful, viable clutches. The age at sexual maturity is the same as other northern Accipiters as well as most buteonine hawks (eagles, on the other hand, can take twice as long to attain full sexual maturity). 6–9 years of age seem to be the overall peak reproductive years for most northern goshawks. However, some females can reproduce at as old as 17 years old and senescence is ambiguous in both sexes (possibly not occurring in males). Median values of brood success was found to be 77% in Europe and 82% in North America overall. Conversely, the median brood size is about half a chick smaller in North America than in Europe. In Europe, clutch size overall averages 3.3, the number of nestlings averages 2.5 and fledglings averages 1.9.

Lifespan

The lifespan in the wild is variable. It is known that in captivity, northern goshawks may live up to 27 years of age. Wild birds that survive their first two years can expect a lifespan of up to 11 years. There is one record (apparently sourced to the AOU) of a 16-year, 4-month-old goshawk. In Fennoscandia, starvation was found to account for 3-6% of reported deaths. In Norway, 9% of deaths were from starvation, but the percentage of demises from this increased to the north and affected juveniles more so than adults. In Gotland, Sweden, 28% of mortality was from starvation and disease. Both bacterial and viral diseases have been known to cause mortality in wild northern goshawks. Variable numbers of goshawks are killed by flying into man-made objects such as power lines and buildings and by automobiles, although lesser numbers are affected by powerline collisions than larger types of raptor.

Status
Densities in western and central Europe were recorded at 3–5 pairs per . In boreal Sweden, numbers vary from 1 to 4.5 pairs per , while in similar habitat in Alaska there were 0.3 to 2.7/. An average of only 1 pair per  would give world population of 600,000 breeding birds, likely at least half as many immature and other non-breeders. Recent study found 145,000–160,000 in Europe or 1 pair/ to 1 pair/. The total population of northern goshawks in the world probably ranges well over a million. The total European populations, estimated at as many as 160,000 pairs, makes it the fourth most numerous raptor in the continent, after the common buzzards (>700,000 pairs), Eurasian sparrowhawk (>340,000 pairs) and common kestrel (>330,000 pairs). The most populated countries by goshawks in Europe were Sweden (an estimated 10,000 pairs), Germany (8,500 pairs), Finland (6,000 pairs) and France (5,600 pairs). The highest densities of breeding pairs per  of land were in The Netherlands, Latvia and Switzerland, although this is biased due to the small land area of these countries. Russia has a roughly estimated 85,000 pairs of northern goshawk. In North America, there are a broadly estimated 150,000–300,000 individuals. In North America, most western populations at mid-latitudes have approximately 3.6–10.7 pairs. A total of 107 nesting territories (1991–1996) were located on a  study area on the Kaibab Plateau, AZ, resulting in a density of 8.4 pairs/. The estimated density in Pennsylvania (1.17 pairs/) suggests that eastern populations may occur at lower densities than western populations, but densities of eastern populations may increase as these populations recover. Typically, populations at far northern latitudes may occur at lower densities than those of southwestern and western populations in North America. Although median densities was similar, populations are overall much denser in Europe than in North America. The hotspots of density for goshawks in Europe lie in east-central Europe (around Poland) and in west-central area (the Netherlands/West Germany). Per the IUCN, the global population is estimated to consist of 1 million to nearly 2.5 million birds, making this one of the most numerous species in its diverse family (the red-tailed hawk and black kite both may have a similar global population size, whereas the Eurasian sparrowhawk and common buzzard are possibly slightly more numerous than goshawks despite their smaller ranges).

Mortality rates for first-year goshawks is often considerably higher than older birds. In studies from Gotland, Sweden, Schleswig-Holstein, Germany and the Netherlands, 40–42% of first-years died. By the second year, mortality rates drop to 31–35%, based on ring studies from the Netherlands and Finland. Based on studies from Gotland, Finland and the southwestern United States, annual mortality for adults is 15–21%, however, feather results indicate that annual mortality for adult goshawks is up to 7% higher in Europe than in North America. In many parts of the range, especially Europe, historic populations decreased regionally due to human persecution (especially shooting), disturbance and epidemic loss of habitat, especially during the 19th century and early 20th. Some states, like Pennsylvania, paid $5 bounties on Goshawks in the 1930s. From 1880 to 1930, an estimated 3,000–5,500 goshawk were being killed annually in Norway when bounties were offered. Shooting rate lowered later, causing the average number of goshawks shot to drop to 654 to for the period 1965–1970. Northern goshawks continue to be persecuted in Norway, shown by the high turnover rate of breeding females in Telemark County, revealed by DNA analysis of moulted feathers.   In Finland, where the species was not legally protected, 4,000–8,000 goshawks were being killed annually from 1964 to 1975. Most goshawks shot are incautious juveniles, with 58% of juvenile mortality in Germany and 59% from the Netherlands being killings by humans. Increase of pheasant releases in Vendsyssel, Denmark from 6,000 to 35,000 since 1994 has resulted in fewer goshawks as they often hunt the pheasants in winter and are shot, legally, by the region's gamekeepers. As recently as about 5 years before that, intentional killing by humans continued as the main cause of mortality for goshawks on Gotland, Sweden, causing 36% of deaths. In the United Kingdom and Ireland, the northern goshawk was extirpated in the 19th century because of specimen collectors and persecution by gamekeepers, but in recent years it has come back by immigration from Europe, escaped falconry birds, and deliberate releases. The goshawk is now found in considerable numbers in Kielder Forest, Northumberland, which is the largest forest in Britain. Overall there are some 620 pairs in Britain.

In the 1950s–1960s declines were increasingly linked with pesticide pollution. However, in early 1970s pesticide levels in the United States for goshawks were low. Eggshell thinning has not been a problem for most populations, although California eggshells (weight and thickness index) pre-1947 (pre-DDT) to 1947—1964 (DDT in use) declined some 8-12%. In Illinois, migratory goshawks during the winter of 1972-1973 invasion year contained less organochlorine and PCB residues than did other raptors, however, these birds were probably from nonagricultural, northern forests. Higher DDT levels seemed to have persisted quite recently in Europe. This was the case in Germany, especially in former East Germany where DDT was widely available until 1988, having been largely discontinued elsewhere after the 1970s. Goshawks, which had increased in The Netherlands after World War II due to less persecution, new woodlands and increased pigeon numbers, were found to have suddenly crashed from the late 1950s on. It was later revealed that this was due to DDT, the number of breeding pairs decreasing 84% from 1958 to 1963. As opposed to DDT, the main contaminant found to have reduced goshawks in Scandinavia during the 20th century were methyl mercury seed dressings used to reduce fungal attack in livestock.

Seemingly the remaining persistent conservation threat to goshawks, given their seeming overall resilience (at the species level) to both persecution and pesticides, is deforestation. Timber harvests are known to destroy many nests and adversely regional populations. Harvest methods that create extensive areas of reduced forest canopy cover, dropping to cover less than 35-40%, may be especially detrimental as cases of this usually cause all goshawks to disappear from the area. However, the mortality rates due to foresting practices are unknown and it is possible that some mature goshawks may simply be able to shift to other regions when a habitat becomes unsuitable but this is presumably unsustainable in the long-term. In harvest forests of California, where overstory trees are frequently removed, goshawks have been found to successfully remain as breeding species as long as some mature stands are left intact. Despite the decline of habitat quality and the frequent disturbances, this region's goshawks breeding success rates somewhat improbably did not reduce. Similarly, a study from Italy and France shows that goshawks only left woodlots when the canopy was reduced by more than 30%, although the European goshawk populations have long been known to be adaptable to some degree of habitat fragmentation.  Based on habitat usage studied in New Jersey and New York, this adaptability is not seen everywhere, as here nests were further from human habitation than expected on the basis of available habitat, an observation suggesting that disturbance regionally can reduce habitat quality. Similarly, studies from the American southwest and Canada have indicated that heavily logged areas caused strong long-term regional declines for goshawks. In Arizona, it was found that even when the nests were left intact, the noisy timber harvest work often caused failure of nesting during the incubation stage, and all nesting attempts that were occurring within  of active logging failed, frequently after parents abandoned the nest. Other noisy activity, such as camping, have also caused nests to failure. Wildlife researchers and biologists do not seem to negatively affect goshawk nests, as they aware to keep forays to the nest brief and capture of adult goshawks for radio-tagging was found to not harm their success at raising broods.

In North America, several non-governmental conservation organizations petitioned the Department of Interior, United States Fish & Wildlife Service (1991 & 1997) to list the goshawk as "threatened" or "endangered" under the authority of the Endangered Species Act. Both petitions argued for listing primarily on the basis of historic and ongoing nesting habitat loss, specifically the loss of old-growth and mature forest stands throughout the goshawk's known range. In both instances, the U.S. Fish & Wildlife Service concluded that listing was not warranted, but state and federal natural resource agencies responded during the petition process with standardized and long-term goshawk inventory and monitoring efforts, especially throughout U.S. Forest Service lands in the Western U.S. The United States Forest Service (US Dept of Agriculture) has listed the goshawk as a "sensitive species", while it also benefits from various protection at the state level. In North America, the goshawk is federally protected under the Migratory Bird Treaty Act of 1918 by an amendment incorporating native birds of prey into the Act in 1972. The northern goshawk is also listed in Appendix II of the Convention on International Trade in Endangered Species (CITES).

Relationship with humans

Human culture
The northern goshawk appears on the flag and coat of arms of the Azores. The archipelago of the Azores, Portugal, takes its name from the Portuguese language word for goshawk, (açor), because the explorers who discovered the archipelago thought the birds of prey they saw there were goshawks; later it was found that these birds were kites or common buzzards (Buteo buteo rothschildi). The goshawk features in Stirling Council's coat of arms via the crest of the Drummond Clan.

Hawks are highly associated with Guru Gobind Singh in the Sikh community. According to ornithologists, he is believed to have kept a white Northern Goshawk. This is reflected in that the Northern Goshawk was made the official state bird of Punjab, India.

In falconry
The name "goshawk" is a traditional name from Anglo-Saxon gōshafoc, literally "goose hawk". The name implies prowess against larger quarry such as wild geese, but were also flown against crane species and other large waterbirds. The name "goose hawk" is somewhat of a misnomer, however, as the traditional quarry for goshawks in ancient and contemporary falconry has been rabbits, pheasants, partridge, and medium-sized waterfowl, which are similar to much of the prey the species hunts in the wild. A notable exception is in records of traditional Japanese falconry, where goshawks were used more regularly on goose and crane species. In ancient European falconry literature, goshawks were often referred to as a yeoman's bird or the "cook's bird" because of their utility as a hunting partner catching edible prey, as opposed to the peregrine falcon, also a prized falconry bird, but more associated with noblemen and less adapted to a variety of hunting techniques and prey types found in wooded areas. The northern goshawk has remained equal to the peregrine falcon in its stature and popularity in modern falconry.

Goshawk hunting flights in falconry typically begin from the falconer's gloved hand, where the fleeing bird or rabbit is pursued in a horizontal chase. The goshawk's flight in pursuit of prey is characterized by an intense burst of speed often followed by a binding maneuver, where the goshawk, if the prey is a bird, inverts and seizes the prey from below. The goshawk, like other accipiters, shows a marked willingness to follow prey into thick vegetation, even pursuing prey on foot through brush. Goshawks trained for falconry not infrequently escape their handlers and, extrapolated from the present day British population which is composed mostly of escaped birds as such, have reasonably high survival rates, although many do die shortly after escape and many do not successfully breed. The effect of modern-day collection of northern goshawks for falconry purposes is unclear, unlike some falcon species which can show regional declines due to heavy falconry collections but can increase in other areas due to established escapees from falconers.

References

Citations

Historical material
 "Falco atricapillus, Ash-coloured or Black-cap Hawk"; from American Ornithology 2nd edition, volume 1 (1828) by Alexander Wilson and George Ord. Colour plate from 1st edition by A. Wilson.
 John James Audubon. "The Goshawk", Ornithological Biography volume 2 (1834). "Goshawk" (note in Appendix), Ornithological Biography volume 5 (1839). "The Goshawk" (with illustration), Birds of America octavo edition, 1840.

External links

 
 Northern goshawk species account – Cornell Lab of Ornithology
 Northern goshawk - Accipiter gentilis – USGS Patuxent Bird Identification InfoCenter
 Environment Canada goshawk page
 Ageing and sexing (PDF; 5.4 MB) by Javier Blasco-Zumeta & Gerd-Michael Heinze
 Feathers of Northern goshawk (Accipiter gentilis)
 
 The Medicine Bow National Forest (A habitat for the Northern goshawk) – Biodiversity Conservation Alliance
 
 
 
 

northern goshawk
Birds of prey
Falconry
True hawks
Holarctic birds
northern goshawk
Birds of India
Birds of Russia
Birds of the United States
Birds of Canada
northern goshawk